Sand Point is a community in the township of McNab/Braeside, Ontario, Canada, along the Ottawa River, roughly six miles to the west of Arnprior on the River Road.  During the 1860s and early 1870s it was the terminus of the Canada Central Railway (subsequently acquired by the Canadian Pacific Railway). At one point Sand Point boasted a hotel, a dance hall, a general store, and a post office.

Sand Point Ferry Norvic 
For decades Sand Point was the Ontario terminus of the Sand Point, Ontario-Norway Bay, Quebec ferry which provided access to the CPR and Anrprior. From 1923 to 1963 the eight car ferry, Norvic, landed at the Norway Bay Wharf. The Norvic was originally owned by Colonel Courtney, and her father-in-law James Young, both of Ottawa, with Dudley Gamble as manager.
The ferry was sold in 1963 to Mr. Charles Bond of the Bond Marina at Manotick, Ontario. Mr. Gamble who owned the ferry paid the wharfage fees charged each year by the federal government. Gamble died in 1966.
 The ferry has been revived as a tour boat in the 1000 Islands system. The boat was the successor to the old Norway Belle destroyed by ice when it was pushed off the Norway Bay wharf in 1919. The "Norvic" derived its name from its home harbor, Norway Bay, and its builders, Vicker's Marine of Montreal. Seventy two feet long with a beam of twenty two feet, solid steel hull with diesel engine, built in 1922.Some of the captains who sailed the Norvic were Captains Charier and Fleming, Dudley Gamble,the Bailey brothers, Jack, George and Lincoln and Jim McKnight.

For those who are familiar with the Norvic, the vessel had a very distinctive and unique bow and stern shape. In approximately the year 2003, the easily recognizable hull of the boat was sited as the base of a refurbished yacht tied up at a marina on the Ottawa River near Rideau Falls.
The boat was refurbished by Ottawa developer Bill Teron and relaunched in 1989.

Sand Point Golf Club 

In 1924 several Arnprior residents began construction of a golf course and club on the hill above Sand Point where it remains a mainstay of the community. In 2018 the golf club was sold, and renamed as "Sand Point Golf Club".

Algonquin Trail 
In 2018 the former railbed was converted into a recreational trail for snowmobiles and four-wheelers. The trail connects Arnprior with Renfrew, Ontario via Braeside, Sand Point and Castleford. Users are advised to limit their speeds to 20 km/h when going through Sand Point by a new sign installed in 2020

Rhoddy's Bay 
Rhoddy's Bay just west of Sand Point along the River Road is a popular summer cottage destination with great beaches and sandy river bottoms.

In 2017 & 2019 the community experienced floods that were the worst of the Ottawa area spring flooding of those years.

You can find a Little Free Library on Sullivan's Point in the community. This small structure is open to anyone to donate, and borrow books within Rhoddy's Bay

Rail accident 

On February 9, 1904, Canadian Pacific train 7 collided head on with Canadian Pacific train 8 about two miles west of Sand Point. Thirteen people were killed:
Joseph Jackson, engineer, Ottawa
W. Mullen, newsagent, Montreal
Robert Thompson, express messenger, Montreal
John O'Toole, baggageman, Ottawa
Ernest Dubois, firefighter, Hochelaga
Nelson Robertson, express manager, Montreal
Joseph Chalu
Dolphis Seguin
J. Carriere
M. LeBrun
William Pouilotte, Whitney, Ontario
two unidentified persons

References 

Communities in Renfrew County
Ferries of Ontario